Back Door Men is the second album by The Shadows of Knight. Both this album and its predecessor, Gloria, were released in 1966 and are considered to be seminal garage band albums. As noted by one reviewer, "The original LP version of this album, the second by the legendary white Chicago garage punk/blues outfit, was one of the most sought-after artifacts of mid-'60s punk rock. Back Door Men was a loud, feedback-laden, sneering piece of rock & roll defiance, mixing raunchy anthems to teenage lust (Gospel Zone', 'Bad Little Woman'), covers of Chicago blues classics (Willie Dixon's 'Spoonful', Jimmy Reed's 'Peepin' and Hidin'), raga rock ('The Behemoth'), folk-rock ('Hey Joe', 'Three for Love', 'I'll Make You Sorry'), and a blues-punk grab off of commercial Top 40 ('Tomorrow's Gonna Be Another Day'), all on one 12" platter. What makes the record even more startling is that every one of these tracks, however far afield they go from one another, works.".

Background
Back Door Men was recorded at Universal Recording in Chicago, Illinois, in late 1966. The album was recorded as a quick follow-up to the Shadows of Night # 10 debut release Gloria. By the time of this recording, Warren Rogers and Joe Kelley had traded instruments and David Wolinski had been added on keyboards. "Bad Little Woman", a cover of the Belfast band The Wheels, backed by "Gospel Zone" was released as the first single, but only charted as high as # 91. A second single, "I'm Gonna Make You Mine", a non-album cut backed by "I'll Make You Sorry" did only slightly better at # 90. A third single at that time, "Willie Jean" (a Hoyt Axton tune incorrectly identified on the label as "traditional")/"The Behemoth" did not chart. As with their first album, production was credited as  "Produced for Dunwich Records" instead of crediting a specific producer. The original album incorrectly lists Dino Valenti as the composer for "Hey Joe".

Track listing
 "Bad Little Woman" (Herbie Armstrong, Victor Catling, Rod Demick, Brian Rosbotham, Tito Tinsley) – 2:37
 "Gospel Zone" (Tom Schiffour) – 3:19
 "The Behemoth" (Harry Pye) – 2:34
 "Three for Love" (Joseph J. Kelly) – 3:11
 "Hey Joe" (Billy Roberts) – 5:42
 "I'll Make You Sorry" (Kelly) – 2:42
 "Peepin' and Hidin'" (Jimmy Reed) - 3:01
 "Tomorrow's Going to Be Another Day" (Tommy Boyce) – 2:23
 "New York Bullseye" (Harry Pye) – 2:43
 "High Blood Pressure" (Huey "Piano" Smith, Johnny Vincent) – 3:38
 "Spoonful" (Willie Dixon) – 2:57

Bonus tracks on LP and CD reissue, 1998
 "Gospel Zone" (single version) (Schiffour) – 3:20
 "Willie Jean" (single) (Hoyt Axton, incorrectly identified as "Traditional; arranged by Harry Pye") – 2:50
 "I'm Gonna Make You Mine" (single) (William Carr, Carl D'Errico, Carole Bayer Sager) – 2:30

Personnel
Shadows of Knight
 David "Hawk" Wolinski – organ, piano, keyboards on "Bad Little Woman", "Hey Joe", "Peepin' and Hidin'" and "New York Bullseye"
 Joseph J. Kelly – guitar, harmonica, harp
 Jerry McGeorge – guitar, rhythm guitar, feedback
 Warren Rogers – bass guitar
 Tom Schiffour – drums
 James Alan Sohns – maracas, marimba, tambourine, vocals
Technical
 Bob Kidder – engineer
 Bob Irwin – mastering
 Rich Russell – package design
 Clark Besch – graphic design, photography
 Steve Besch – graphic design, photography
 Paul Hippensteel – graphic design, photography
 Jeff Jarema – graphic design, photography
 Tim Livingston – project manager
 Don Bronstein - cover photography

Chart performances

Single

References 

The Shadows of Knight albums
1966 albums
Sundazed Records albums